Joe Canestraro (born November 9, 1976) is an American politician who has served in the West Virginia House of Delegates from the 4th district from December 1, 2016 until December 1, 2020.  On January 1, 2021 he became the Prosecuting Attorney for Marshall County, west Virginia.

References

1976 births
Living people
Democratic Party members of the West Virginia House of Delegates
21st-century American politicians